= Zepol =

American trade data company and service

- Founded: 2002
- Founder: Paul Rasmussen and Jeff Wilson
- Headquarters: Edina, Minnesota
- Website: www.zepol.com

Zepol is a subscription-based service founded by Paul Rasmussen and Jeff Wilson in Edina, Minnesota. It provides access to U.S. trade data tools based on information from U.S. Customs, other government sources, and information gathered from vessel manifests filed at various ports.
